La Bernerie-en-Retz (literally La Bernerie in Retz) is a commune in the Loire-Atlantique department, western France.

Population

Transport
Gare de La Bernerie-en-Retz is served by train services between Pornic and Nantes.

See also
Communes of the Loire-Atlantique department

References

External links
Official site

Communes of Loire-Atlantique
Pornic Agglo Pays de Retz